Hamilton Dyce (14 March 1912 – 8 January 1972) was an English stage, film and television actor.

His television work included the 1970 Doctor Who serial Spearhead from Space, where he played General Scobie.

Selected filmography
 Whistle Down the Wind (1961) - Mr. Reeves
 Mrs. Gibbons' Boys (1962) - PC Draper
 Master Spy (1963) - Airport Controller
 Dr. Crippen (1963) - Dr. Rogers
 Becket (1964) - Bishop of Chichester
 The Comedy Man (1964) - Burial Minister (uncredited)
 King Rat (1965) - The Padre
 Sky West and Crooked (1966) - Bill Slim - grave digger
 The Wrong Box (1966) - Derek Lloyd Peter Digby
 Two Gentlemen Sharing (1969) - Dickson Senior
 Unman, Wittering and Zigo (1971) - Mr. Winstanley
 On the Run (1971) - Removal Man
 The Pied Piper (1972) - Papal Nuncio (Last appearance)

References

External links
 

1912 births
1972 deaths
English male stage actors
English male film actors
English male television actors
People from Sandhurst, Berkshire
20th-century English male actors